Gramine (also called donaxine) is a naturally occurring indole alkaloid present in several plant species. Gramine may play a defensive role in these plants, since it is toxic to many organisms.

Occurrence
Gramine has been found in the giant reed, Arundo donax, Acer saccharinum (Silver Maple), Hordeum, (a grass genus that includes barley) and Phalaris (another grass genus).

Effects and toxicity
Gramine has been found to act as an agonist of the adiponectin receptor 1 (AdipoR1).

The LD50 of gramine is 44.6 mg/ kg iv in mice and 62.9 mg/ kg iv in rats. 
Numerous studies have been done on the toxicity in insects harmful to crops for use as a possible insecticide.

References

Adiponectin receptor agonists
Indole alkaloids
Dimethylamino compounds
Plant toxins